Terje Andersen (born 12 May 1975), known professionally as Cyrus, is a Norwegian musician best known as the guitarist of the black metal band Susperia. He plays guitar and bass guitar.

Biography 
Cyrus started his career in 1997 when he went playing in a band called Seven Sins with ex-Dimmu Borgir drummer Tjodalv. The band released one demo tape in that period. In 1999, they changed name to Susperia.

In 2000, Cyrus went playing guitar with Satyricon for a worldwide tour. He was in Satyricon for two years as session member. In 2009, he became a session guitarist of thrash/black metal band Sarke. In 2011, with Susperia he released first Susperia's single "Nothing Remains". 

Cyrus recently played guitar in Susperia (as full-time member) and Sarke (as session member) and bass guitar in Dimmu Borgir (as session member).

Discography

With Susperia 
Illusions of Evil (Demo, 2000)
Predominance (Nuclear Blast, 2001)
Vindication (Nuclear Blast, 2002)
Unlimited (Tabu, 2004)
Devil May Care (EP, Tabu, 2005)
Cut From Stone (Tabu, 2007)
Attitude (Candlelight Records, 2009)
Nothing Remains (Single, NRK/MGP, 2011)
The Lyricist (Agonia, 2018)

 With Dimmu Borgir Forces of the Northern Night (2012)

 With ICS Vortex Storm Seeker (2011)

 With Sarke Oldarhian'' (2011)

References 

1975 births
Living people
21st-century Norwegian guitarists
Norwegian heavy metal guitarists
Susperia members